Lluïsa Forrellad i Miquel (27 May 1927 – 4 August 2018) was a Spanish writer who wrote in Catalan and Spanish. She received the Premio Nadal in 1953 for Siempre en capilla. She was the twin sister of Francesca Forrellad.

Bibliography

Theatre plays 
 Dos razones
 Regimiento de caza 43

Novels 
 Siempre en capilla (Barcelona: Editorial Destino, 1953)
 Foc latent (Barcelona: Angle Editorial, 2006)
 Sempre en capella (Barcelona: Angle Editorial, 2007)
 Retorn amarg (Barcelona: Angle Editorial, 2008)
 El primer assalt (Barcelona: Angle Editorial, 2009)
 L'olor del mal (Barcelona: Angle Editorial, 2011)

References

1927 births
2018 deaths
People from Sabadell
Women writers from Catalonia
20th-century Spanish women writers
21st-century Spanish women writers
Spanish twins